Reelfoot Lake State Park is a state park in the northwest corner of Tennessee in the United States. It encompasses Reelfoot Lake and is situated in Lake and Obion counties. The park itself makes up , divided into ten sections around the lake. A major hunting and fishing preserve, it is part of a much larger wildlife refuge which comprises ,  of which are water, and harbors almost every kind of shorebird, as well as the golden and American bald eagles. Other animals are also diverse and abundant. The many species of flowering and non-flowering plants attract botany enthusiasts from all over the country. Baldcypress dominates the margins of the lake, but many other trees and shrubs are also present.

Activities 
Activities at Reelfoot Lake State Park include boating, fishing, hiking, museum and nature center, picnic facilities, wildlife viewing, and planned programs and events.

Boating 
Reelfoot lake is open to boating throughout the year. Boat ramps are located at various points around the lake. As Reelfoot Lake contains a partially submerged forest, boaters should use caution at all times.

Fishing 
Fishing is available throughout the year on Reelfoot lake. Bass, crappie, and catfish are most popular sought after fish. The appropriate Tennessee fishing license and lake permits are required for anglers.

Hiking 
Reelfoot Lake State Park offers several easy to moderate trails allowing access to the unique wetland areas available. Trail information is available at the park's visitor center.

Museum and Nature Center 
The R.C. Donaldson Memorial Museum features a variety of exhibits displaying the ecology, history, and culture of the area. The nature center at the museum contains various non-releasable raptors, several snakes, and other wildlife.

Picnic facilities 
Reelfoot offers visitors approximately 200 picnic sites. Most of the sites have grills and all sites are adjacent to drinking
water, toilet facilities, and playgrounds. The park also offers five large pavilions for group use.

Wildlife viewing 
A plethora of wildlife is available for viewing at Reelfoot Lake State Park. Popular wildlife for viewing include Bald eagles, golden eagles, ospreys and other birds of prey. Reelfoot Lake is also located on a major migratory bird flyway which creates opportunities to view a variety of waterfowl, shorebirds, herons, and songbirds. It also has a diversity of turtles and snakes. Turtles include the pond slider, painted, and map turtles. Snakes include the banded and diamondback water snakes, the venomous cottonmouth, and the milk and corn snakes. Frogs, also common, include the green frog, and the gray and green tree frogs, which are vocal during the summers.

Planned programs 
Rangers at Reelfoot offer a variety of programs throughout the year. From January through Mid-March, the park offers a bald eagle tour around Reelfoot lake. Scenic boat tours are offered on the lake from May through September.

References

External links 

 
Reelfoot Lake Official Website

State parks of Tennessee
Protected areas of Lake County, Tennessee
Protected areas of Obion County, Tennessee
Nature centers in Tennessee
Natural history museums in Tennessee